The Deadly Affair is a 1967 British spy film based on John le Carré's first novel, Call for the Dead (1961). The film stars James Mason and was directed by Sidney Lumet from a script by Paul Dehn.

As it is a Columbia Pictures production and Paramount owned the film rights to the name George Smiley, the central character is renamed Charles Dobbs. Paramount acquired the film rights to the character name when filming The Spy Who Came In from the Cold (1965).

The soundtrack was composed by Quincy Jones, and the bossa nova theme song, "Who Needs Forever", was performed by Astrud Gilberto.

Plot
In 1960s London, Charles Dobbs (James Mason) is a staid MI5 operative investigating Foreign Office official Samuel Fennan (Robert Flemyng), a former Communist who apparently commits suicide. Dobbs becomes suspicious about the cause of Fennan's death while visiting Fennan's widow the morning after his death. When a wake-up call is received at Fennan's home, his widow Elsa (Simone Signoret) says the call was for her. Dobbs discovers this to be a lie, and as a result Dobbs suspects that Elsa, a survivor of a Nazi extermination camp, might have some clues regarding Fennan's death.

Other government officials want Dobbs to drop the case. However, Dobbs privately links up with retired police inspector Mendel (Harry Andrews) to continue enquiries and they uncover a network of Communist agents. Dobbs also discovers that his wife Ann (Harriet Andersson) is leaving him to go to Switzerland to join a former World War II colleague, Dieter Frey (Maximilian Schell).

Dobbs ultimately decides to set a trap to prove that Elsa is a spy and to uncover her control by arranging a rendezvous which takes place in the Aldwych theatre during a performance of "Edward II". Dobbs, his colleague Bill Appleby (Kenneth Haigh) and Mendel observe Elsa and wait to see who will sit in the empty seat next to her. Dobbs is shocked to see that it is Dieter who sits down next to Elsa and is her control. When Dieter and Elsa realise they have been set up, Dieter secretly kills Elsa and slips out of the theatre. Mendel follows Dieter to his hideout and summons Dobbs. In the final confrontation, Dieter shoots Mendel but is himself killed bare-handed by the enraged Dobbs.

Dobbs flies to Zurich where he is met at the airport by Ann.

Cast
 James Mason as Charles Dobbs
 Simone Signoret as Elsa Fennan
 Maximilian Schell as Dieter Frey
 Harriet Andersson as Ann Dobbs
 Harry Andrews as Mendel
 Kenneth Haigh as Bill Appleby
 Roy Kinnear as Adam Scarr
 Max Adrian as Advisor
 Lynn Redgrave as Virgin
 Robert Flemyng as Samuel Fennan
 Leslie Sands as Inspector
 Corin Redgrave as David
 Sheraton Blount as Eunice Scarr (uncredited) 
 Denis Shaw as Wilf the Barman (uncredited)
 David Warner as the actor playing Edward II in the Aldwych Theatre

Production
Location shooting for The Deadly Affair took place in London, in St. James's Park, at The Balloon Tavern and Chelsea Embankment in Chelsea, in Battersea and Barnes, in Twickenham, and at the Serpentine Restaurant in Hyde Park (demolished in 1990). The exterior of Dobbs's house is in St. George's Square, Pimlico. For the theatre scene a performance of the Royal Shakespeare Company Edward II  was recreated at its real location of the Aldwych Theatre, London.

Director of photography Freddie Young's technique of pre-exposing the colour film negative to a small, controlled amount of light (known as "flashing" or "pre-fogging") in order to create a muted colour palette was first used in this film. Lumet called the result "colourless colour"  and it proved influential, being used by other cinematographers such as Vilmos Zsigmond on McCabe & Mrs. Miller.

Awards and honours
The Deadly Affair received five BAFTA Awards nominations: Best British Film for Sidney Lumet, Best British Screenplay for Paul Dehn, Best British Cinematography (Colour) for Freddie Young, Best Foreign Actress for Simone Signoret, and Best British Actor for James Mason. However, it did not win any of the awards.

Musical score and soundtrack

The film score was composed, arranged and conducted by Quincy Jones, and the soundtrack album was released on the Verve label in 1967.

Allmusic's Stephen Cook noted, "Deadly Affair's dreamy mix of bossa nova moods and unobtrusive symphonics still makes for some pleasant, if not always provocative, listening. Plus, one gets to hear Astrud Gilberto in fine fettle on the opening cut". The Vinyl Factory said "This soundtrack to the Sidney Lumet thriller starts off with Astrud Gilberto drizzling her best desultory vocal over ‘Who Needs Forever’, which creates a moody atmosphere that is sustained throughout the entire album. With its languid orchestrations, breezy strings, and airy samba rhythms, this is a perfect Sunday morning record".

Track listing
All compositions by Quincy Jones
 "Who Needs Forever" (lyrics by Howard Greenfield) − 3:00
 "Dieter's First Mistake" − 4:50
 "Instrumental Main Theme (1)" − 2:05
 "Postcard Signed "S" / Mendel Tails Elsa / Tickets to "S"" − 5:31
 "Instrumental Main Theme (2)" − 3:00
 "Don't Fly If It's Foggy" − 1:11
 "Blondie-Tails" − 1:13
 "Instrumental Main Theme (3)" − 2:05
 "Ridiculous Scene" − 1:48
 "Body on Elevator" − 0:55
 "Bobb's at Gunpoint" − 0:45
 "End Title" − 1:42

Personnel
Unidentified orchestra arranged and conducted by Quincy Jones featuring:
Hank Jones − piano
Astrud Gilberto − vocals (track 1)

References

External links

1967 films
1960s spy films
Films about adultery in the United Kingdom
British spy films
Cold War spy films
Columbia Pictures films
Films scored by Quincy Jones
Films directed by Sidney Lumet
Films based on works by John le Carré
Films set in London
Films with screenplays by Paul Dehn
1960s English-language films
1960s British films